Yulestar (foaled 25 December 1994) was a New Zealand Standardbred racehorse, notable for winning the 2000 New Zealand Trotting Cup and the 2001 Inter Dominion Pacing Championship.  He was awarded the totle of New Zealand Harness Horse of the Year for the 2000/01 season.

Yulestar got his name because he was born on Christmas Day. He was bred by Mrs M V Law and bought for $9,000 by Lorraine and Ron Nolan, from Hawera, Taranaki.   

Yulestar was trained by Lorraine Nolan and his win in the 2000 race meant she was the first woman to train a New Zealand Cup winner. 

He was driven by Tony Shaw and then later by Peter Jones.

From 2003 to 2006 Yulestar raced in the United States and Canada, winning 13 races, trained by former New Zealander Brett Pelling. After his last race in 2006, he returned to Hawera and he died in 2019 aged 25.

Notable races

Yulestar's career included:

 January 2000 - 1st in the A G Hunter Cup beating Happy Asset and Slug Of Jin
 November 2000 - 1st in the New Zealand Trotting Cup beating Bogan Fella and Kym's Girl
 May 2001 - 1st in the Inter Dominion Pacing Championship (Albion Park) beating Atitagain and Pocket Me as well as Courage Under Fire, Shakamaker and Holmes D G 
 November 2002 - 1st in the New Zealand Free For All beating Young Rufus and Stars And Stripes

See also
 Harness racing in New Zealand

References

1994 animal births
2019 animal deaths
Inter Dominion winners
New Zealand standardbred racehorses
New Zealand Trotting Cup winners